Ave Maria Ninchi (14 December 1914 – 10 November 1997) was an Italian supporting actress who played character roles on stage, television, and in over 98 feature films that included Tomorrow Is Too Late (1949) and Louis Malle's Murmur of the Heart (1971) and Lacombe Lucien (1974).

Ninchi worked with some of Italy's top movie stars, including Sophia Loren, Anna Magnani, Marcello Mastroianni, Alberto Sordi, and Gina Lollobrigida; her performances playing in duo with Aldo Fabrizi and Totò are particularly memorable. Her television career was at its peak during the 1960s and 1970s when she was appearing in some of Italy's top-rated series.

Selected filmography

Circo equestre Za-bum (1944) - (segment "Galop finale al circo")
Un giorno nella vita (1946) - Suor Celeste
Un uomo ritorna (1946) - Un'amica di Adele
Canto, ma sottovoce... (1946) - Laura, la cameriera
Before Him All Rome Trembled (1946) - Nina
Roma città libera (1946) - L'affittacamere
To Live in Peace (1947) - Corinna
Flesh Will Surrender (1947) - Emilia Canale
L'onorevole Angelina (1947) - Carmela
The Captain's Daughter (1947) - La signora Mironova, madre di Mascia
Christmas at Camp 119 (1947) - La signora Mancini
Heart (1948) - Signora Serra, mother
Difficult Years (1948) - Rosina Piscitello
Immigrants (1948) - Adele Bordoni
The Firemen of Viggiù (1949) - Gaetana
Addio Mimí! (1949) - Opera singer 'La Boheme'
The Walls of Malapaga (1949) - Maria, la voisine / Maria, la vicina
The Bride Can't Wait (1949) - Evilina
Yvonne of the Night (1949) - Rudegarda, la padrona del ristorante
I Peggiori anni della nostra vita (1949)
Little Lady (1949) - Iris
Sunday in August (1950) - Fernanda
Toto Looks for a Wife (1950) - La zia
Cavalcade of Heroes (1950) - Aurelia
Pact with the Devil (1950) - Signora Mola - Giacomo's wife
Il vedovo allegro (1950) - Dolores
The Beggar's Daughter (1950) - Marisa, la governante di Anna
Tomorrow Is Too Late (1950) - Signora Berardi
Sambo (1950) - Amelia Cicerchia
 The Devil in the Convent (1950) - Caterina
Teresa (1951) - Teresa's Mother
Duello senza onore (1951) - Goverante
Paris Is Always Paris (1951) - Elvira de Angelis
The Seven Dwarfs to the Rescue (1951) - The Nanny
Messalina (1951) - Locusta / Locuste
The Passaguai Family (1951) - Margherita, moglie di Giuseppe
Cops and Robbers (1951) - Giovanna Bottoni
Three Girls from Rome (1952) - Giulia, Marisa's mother
Amori e veleni (1952)
 The Passaguai Family Gets Rich (1952) - Margherita, moglie di Giuseppe
Stranger on the Prowl (1952)
Beauties in Capri (1952) - Cornelia
Papà diventa mamma (1952) - Sua moglie Margherita
Mademoiselle Gobete (1952) - Aglae Tricoin
Toto and the Women (1952) - Giovanna Scaparro
We're Dancing on the Rainbow (1952) - Donna Rosa
Serenata amara (1952) - La madre die Mario
La colpa di una madre (1952) - Rosa
The Piano Tuner Has Arrived (1952) - Signora Narducci
Good Folk's Sunday (1953) - Elvira
I Chose Love (1953) - Giovanna
Gioventù alla sbarra (1953) - La sorella del giudice
Martin Toccaferro (1953) - Signora Molinari
Condannatelo! (1953)
Canto per te (1953) - Zia Bettina
Marriage (1954) - Anastasia Scingalova, la madre della sposa
Delirio (1954) - Cecilia
The Air of Paris  (1954)
Toto Seeks Peace (1954) - Gemma Torresi Piselli
Madonna delle rose (1954)
La Grande avventura (1954)
Eighteen Year Olds (1955) - Signorina Mattei
The Bigamist (1956 film) (1956) - La signora Masetti / Missis Masetti
I Pinguini ci guardano (1956)
 Love (1956) - Beatrice
Una Pelliccia di visone (1957) - Assunta Santini
I Prepotenti (1958) - Clelia Pinelli
Serenatella sciuè sciuè (1958) - Agrippina Scuoffolo
Le Donne ci tengono assai (1959) - Angelica Allegri
Venetian Honeymoon (1959) - Yolanda
Prepotenti più di prima (1959) - Clelia Pinelli
The Nun's Story (1959) - Sister Bernard (uncredited)
Le Notti dei Teddy Boys (1959) - Sora Jole
Purple Noon (1960) - Signora Gianna
Les Bonnes Femmes (1960) - Mme Louise
Un Mandarino per Teo (1960) - Zia Gaspara
Vita col padre e con la madre (1960, TV Mini-Series) - Bessie Logan
Madri pericolose (1960) - Mattea Tornabuoni
I Teddy boys della canzone (1960) - Donna Celestina
Le Ambiziose (1961) - Ines
Maciste contro Ercole nella valle dei guai (1961)
Scandali al mare (1961) - Olga Cappelli
Le magnifiche 7 (1961) - Margherita
Walter e i suoi cugini (1961) - Adele
Gli italiani e le donne (1962) - Cesare Mancini's Wife (segment "Chi la fa l'aspetti")
L' assassino si chiama Pompeo (1962) - Doorkeeper Adelina
Il Mulino del Po (1963, TV Mini-Series) - Donata
Le motorizzate (1963) - Sister Teresa (segment "Carmelitane Sprint")
Cleopazza (1964) - Madre di Gabriella
In ginocchio da te (1964) - Cesira - cook
Le tardone (1964) - Adelina Borletti (episode "Un delitto quasi perfetto")
Ragazzi dell'hully-gully (1964)
Biblioteca di Studio Uno (1964, TV Mini-Series) - La contessa di Tournay
Las Otoñales (1964)
Non son degno di te (1965) - Cesira
Gli altri e noi (1965)
House of Cards (1968) - Signora Orragi
Il Sole è di tutti (1968)
I Due magnifici fresconi (1969) - Adelina Borletti (uncredited)
Sapho ou La fureur d'aimer (1971) - La gouvernante
Le souffle au coeur (1971) - Augusta
Il Furto è l'anima del commercio (1971) - Annunziata Caccavallo
I due assi del guantone (1971) - Adele
Pulp (1972) - Fat Chambermaid
Lacombe, Lucien (1974) - Mme. Georges
Nel mondo di Alice (1974, TV Mini-Series) - La regina di cuori
La Donna serpente (1976, TV Movie) - Smeraldina / Farzana

References

External links
 

1914 births
1997 deaths
Italian film actresses
Accademia Nazionale di Arte Drammatica Silvio D'Amico alumni
Nastro d'Argento winners
20th-century Italian actresses
Italian television actresses
Italian stage actresses